Minda Poochakku Kalyanam is a 1990 Indian Malayalam-language film, directed by Alleppey Ashraf, starring Suresh Gopi and Lissy Priyadarsan in the lead roles. The film is a remake of Hindi film Chitchor (1976).

Plot

Balaraman Pillai (Sankaradi) is a well-to-do villager living in Kuttanadu. He and his wife Sarasamma (Sukumari) are looking for a suitable alliance for their younger daughter Mini (Lissy Priyadarsan). Balaraman Pillai receives a letter from his son-in-law, Ayyappan Kutty, living in Madras informing that an engineer named Kumar from his company is arriving in the village to oversee a construction project. Ayyappan Kutty suggests Kumar as a suitable groom for Mini.

Kumar (Suresh Gopi) arrives in the village and is received by Balaraman Pillai, who arranges accommodation for Kumar. Balaraman Pillai invites Kumar home for dinner and introduces Mini. Kumar and Mini develop a liking for each other. With encouragement from her parents, Mini and Kumar fall in love with each other. Their meetings are always chaperoned by Kuttu, young  son of Sahadevan.

A comic sub plot runs in parallel where the village postman Kamalasanan (Sreenivasan) is in love with Chandramathi (Soorya), while his friend Sahadevan (Jagathy Sreekumar) is afraid of his hard talking wife Parukkutty Amma (Lalithasree).

Balaraman Pillai receives another letter from Ayyappan Kutty stating that Kumar is not the engineer, but an overseer of the same company. This changes Balaraman Pillai and Sarasamma's attitude towards Kumar. They forbid Mini from meeting Kumar. The plot thickens as the engineer Krishnakumar (Mukesh) arrives in the village. Mini gets pressured from her parents to make a good impression with Krishnakumar, which makes her sad and angry. Their engagement is fixed soon and kumar decides to leave the village to madras. Krishnakumar gets to know the truth about Mini and Kumar and says that they should be together. Meanwhile, Mini and Kuttu take a small boat and row towards the boat jetty to see Kumar before he leaves. Unfortunately, they both drown in the backwaters and the movie ends on a tragic note.

Cast
 Suresh Gopi as Kumar
 Lissy Priyadarsan as Mini
 Mukesh as Krishnakumar
 Sankaradi as Balaraman Pillai
 Sukumari as Sarasamma
 Jagathy Sreekumar as Sahadevan	
 Sreenivasan as Kamalasanan
 Lalithasree as Parukkutty Amma
 Soorya as Chandramathi
 Bobby Kottarakkara as Podiyan Pillai

References

External links

1990 films
1990s Malayalam-language films
Malayalam remakes of Hindi films
Films directed by Alleppey Ashraf